Nan Knighton is an American poet, playwright and lyricist.

Biography
Knighton is the daughter of physician Dr. Donald Proctor and artist Janice Proctor.  A native of Baltimore, Maryland, she is a 1965 graduate of Bryn Mawr School, with an undergraduate degree from Sarah Lawrence College and a master's degree in creative writing from Boston University.

She wrote for the Maryland Center for Public Broadcasting television show Consumer Survival Kit.

Knighton wrote the book of the musical Saturday Night Fever which was produced on Broadway in 1999. Collaborating with composer Frank Wildhorn, she wrote the libretto and lyrics of The Scarlet Pimpernel (1997) and Camille Claudel (2003), as well as additional lyrics for Rudolf (2006). She was nominated for the 1998 Tony Award for Best Book of a Musical for The Scarlet Pimpernel.

She is also the author of the plays Bad Dreams and Man With Two Hearts Found on Moon.

She is married to producer and lawyer John Breglio.

References

External links
Official site

American dramatists and playwrights
Living people
Bryn Mawr School people
Year of birth missing (living people)